Harry Lempio (13 July 1932 – 26 August 2007) was a German boxer. He competed in the men's lightweight event at the 1960 Summer Olympics. At the 1960 Summer Olympics, he defeated Noureddine Dziri of Tunisia, before losing to Kazimierz Paździor of Poland.

References

1932 births
2007 deaths
German male boxers
Olympic boxers of the United Team of Germany
Boxers at the 1960 Summer Olympics
People from Gołdap
People from East Prussia
Sportspeople from Warmian-Masurian Voivodeship
Lightweight boxers